Altantsögts (Golden tsogts) is a sum (district) of Bayan-Ölgii Province in western Mongolia. It is primarily inhabited by ethnic Kazakhs. As of 2014 it had a population of 2684 people.

References

Populated places in Mongolia
Districts of Bayan-Ölgii Province